Wolfhart Westendorf (18 September 1924 – 23 February 2018) was a German Egyptologist.  He was a student of Hermann Grapow, and with him, was a co-author of the Grundriss der Medizin der alten Ägypter  (Plan of Medicine of the Ancient Egyptian), the most extensive study of the subject of ancient Egyptian medicine done in any language.  He has also published many other books on Egyptology and the ancient Egyptian language.

References

German Egyptologists
1924 births
2018 deaths
People from the Province of Brandenburg
People from Świebodzin
Members of the Göttingen Academy of Sciences and Humanities